Annie is a 2014 American musical comedy-drama film directed by Will Gluck from a screenplay he co-wrote with Aline Brosh McKenna. Produced by Columbia Pictures in association with Village Roadshow Pictures, Overbrook Entertainment, Marcy Media Films, and Olive Bridge Entertainment, and distributed by Sony Pictures Releasing, it is a contemporary film adaptation of Charles Strouse, Martin Charnin, and Thomas Meehan's 1977 Broadway musical of the same name (which in turn is based on the comic strip Little Orphan Annie by Harold Gray). The film changes the setting from the Great Depression to the present day, and it is the second remake and the third film adaptation of the musical, following the 1982 theatrical film starring Carol Burnett and Albert Finney and the 1999 television film starring Kathy Bates and Victor Garber. The film stars Quvenzhané Wallis in the titular role, alongside Jamie Foxx, Rose Byrne, Bobby Cannavale and Cameron Diaz (in her final film role before her subsequent retirement from acting from 2014 to 2022).  Annie began production in August 2013 and, following a premiere at the Ziegfeld Theatre in New York City on December 7, 2014, it was released theatrically in the United States on December 19. The film received generally negative reviews; the Rotten Tomatoes consensus say it "smothers its likable cast under clichés, cloying cuteness, and a distasteful materialism". It grossed $133.8 million against a budget of between $65–78 million.

Annie received two Golden Globe Award nominations in the categories of Best Actress in a Motion Picture – Comedy or Musical (for Wallis) and Best Original Song. Conversely, the film received two Golden Raspberry nominations and won in the category of Worst Prequel, Remake, Rip-off or Sequel while Diaz was nominated for the Golden Raspberry Award for Worst Supporting Actress. It was followed by a fourth adaptation that was a live NBC production of the musical.

Plot

In Harlem, Manhattan, New York City, Annie Bennett lives in foster care with several other girls under the care of Colleen Hannigan, a bitter former member of C+C Music Factory who spends her days drinking, trying to snag a sweetheart, and giving various grueling chores to the orphans under her care. Annie spends Fridays waiting outside Domani's restaurant, believing her parents will come for her because a note written on a receipt from Domani's says they will return. When a city inspector checks on Miss Hannigan's treatment of the girls, Annie takes advantage of the situation; she manages to copy her social security number from his clipboard and heads off to get her information. Annie learns that there is no more information about her on her record than what she already knows.

While attempting to save a Shiba Inu from bullies, Annie is nearly run over but is saved by Will Stacks, a germaphobic cellphone mogul running for Mayor of New York City. Stacks' rescue of Annie goes viral on the Internet, boosting his popularity; per suggestion of Will's campaign manager Guy Danlily, Annie moves in with Will to boost his popularity further. Annie enjoys her new surroundings, befriending Will's assistant Grace Farrell. Annie also gets to adopt the stray dog from before, naming her Sandy. Bonding with Annie, Will reveals that he had humble beginnings in Queens; he never really knew his father due to his work hours, but believed he could understand him if he worked just as hard. Annie also helps Grace and Will realize that they like each other romantically.

Per Annie's request, Will takes her and her friends in Miss Hannigan's foster care to see the premiere of MoonQuake Lake. Stacks is uninterested in the movie at first, but soon becomes a major fan along with Grace. Per Annie and Grace's insistence, Stacks joins the premiere party. After returning her friends home, Annie shows Grace her Friday routine of waiting to see if her parents will return; Grace sympathizes, agreeing to keep this a secret from Will. At Miss Hannigan's, the girls accidentally wake her; Miss Hannigan snaps at them, saying rich people are selfish and will ditch anyone they do not like anymore; thus recalling her own past. Slightly hung over, she laments about her situation of foster kids and her desire to reclaim stardom.

Annie is invited to a charity event, where she speaks about how grateful she is for all the opportunities she's been presented. When Annie is asked to read a speech, she runs off and reveals that she does not know how to read (despite being 10 years old and attending school). Teaming up with Miss Hannigan, Guy plans to have impostors claim Annie as their daughter to boost Will's popularity to the point where he wins; Guy will then share his payment with Miss Hannigan. However, Guy doesn't care about Annie's well-being, planning to dump Annie back into the foster care system after the election and cutting Hannigan out of the deal.

By the time Miss Hannigan has a change of heart, Annie has already been kidnapped by the imposters. Miss Hannigan tells Will about Guy's role in the scheme, and Will fires him. Will, Grace, Miss Hannigan, Lou and the girls board Will's helicopter; aided by the police, they chase the getaway car into the park. The kidnappers believe that Will paid them to kidnap Annie rather than Guy, so Annie gets upset and chastises Will, thinking he set up the kidnapping and rescue. To prove his innocence, Will announces to the press his withdrawal from the mayoral race, after which Annie helps Grace and Will admit their love for each other. Will cheers Annie up when he decides to adopt her, then all three dance and sing happily.

Annie announces the opening of the "Stacks Literacy Centre", to help children like herself, who cannot read. Everyone sings Annie's "Tomorrow". Humorously, Miss Hannigan attempts to continue singing after the song is done, only to receive stares that cue her to stop.

Cast
Quvenzhané Wallis as Annie Bennett Stacks, an optimistic 10 year old child living in a foster home searching for her parents. Unlike her prior appearances, Annie does not live in an orphanage but is kept in foster care.
 Jamie Foxx as William "Will" Stacks, an entrepreneur in the technology sector (particularly, the mobile phone industry) turned politician, who is trying to run for Mayor of New York City. The character is a modification of Oliver Warbucks. 
 Rose Byrne as Grace Farrell, Stacks' faithful personal assistant and Annie's mother figure.
 Cameron Diaz as Miss Colleen Hannigan, the cruel and drunk control freak who runs the foster home where Annie resides. A slight modification of Miss Agatha "Aggy" Hannigan, she was a big singing star back in the 1990s but ended her career due to having gone insane after drinking alcohol. Hannigan's character is softened from her prior appearances, to the point of experiencing guilt over her part in separating Stacks and Annie and even helping to rescue Annie from her false parents in the film's finale. Miss Hannigan's first name is also changed to Colleen, instead of her previous film name Agatha.
 Bobby Cannavale as Guy Danlily, a "bulldog political adviser" to Stacks. He convinces Stacks to let Annie live with him for the press at first, but later proves that he doesn't care for her well-being. His motives are partly based on Denis J. Dimple.
 Adewale Akinnuoye-Agbaje as Nash, "the tough but lovable bodyguard and driver for Will and a good friend of Annie." He evokes the traits of Punjab and The Asp.
 David Zayas as Lou, the local bodega owner who is a friend of Annie and has a crush on Miss Hannigan. He sees some good in her and finds out she is not as mean as she thinks she is. He evokes the traits of the laundryman Mr. Bundles.
 Stephanie Kurtzuba as Mrs. Kovacevic, the New York Family Services worker who becomes close with Annie's case.

 Amanda Troya as Pepper Ulster, the bossiest and oldest foster girl. She is 12 and a half and says that she is about to turn thirteen and no one wants teenagers.
 Eden Duncan-Smith as Isabella Sullivan, the second oldest of Annie's foster sisters. She is based on Duffy.
 Zoe Margaret Colletti as Tessie Marcus, one of Annie's foster sisters, who is the second youngest and is in the same grade as her.
 Nicolette Pierini as Mia Putnam, the youngest of Annie's foster sisters. Mia is based on Molly and is nine years old. She and Annie both get adopted by Will Stacks and become sisters.
 Marti as Sandy, Annie's dog. Sandy is a female in this film, as opposed to past adaptations where the dog is a male.

Cameos
 Patricia Clarkson as Focus Group Woman
 Michael J. Fox as himself
 Mila Kunis as Andrea Alvin, the lead actress in MoonQuake Lake
 Ashton Kutcher as Simon Goodspeed, the lead actor in MoonQuake Lake
 Bobby Moynihan as Guy in Bar
 Rihanna as Moon Goddess, a supporting character in MoonQuake Lake
 Scarlett Benchley as Sakana, a supporting character in MoonQuake Lake
 Sia as Animal Care & Control Volunteer
 Rachel Crowther as a Street Dancer
 George Clooney as himself

Phil Lord and Christopher Miller's names appear in the end credits of MoonQuake Lake, a fictional film within the film; the scenes were actually directed by Lord and Miller. Taylor Richardson, who played the title role in the 2012 Broadway revival of the musical, appears in the beginning of the film as one of Annie's classmates, also named "Annie".

Musical numbers

While the film incorporates notable songs from the original Broadway production, written by composer Charles Strouse and lyricist Martin Charnin, the songs themselves were rearranged by Sia and Greg Kurstin to reflect its new contemporary setting. Executive music supervisor Matt Sullivan explained that there was a desire to make the film's use of music "seamless" rather than "abrupt", and to maintain the integrity and familiarity of the musical's most iconic songs, including "Tomorrow" and "It's the Hard Knock Life". The songs were rearranged with a percussive, pop-inspired style: in particular, "It's the Hard Knock Life" — whilst maintaining the use of "natural" sounds for its rhythm — was updated in a hip hop style. Lyrics to some songs were also updated to reflect the differences in the film's storyline and settings. Sia and Kurstin wrote three new songs for the soundtrack: "Opportunity", "Who Am I", and "MoonQuake Lake". Sia additionally co-wrote "The City's Yours" with Norwegian Stargate.
 "Maybe" – Annie, Mia, Isabella, Tessie and Pepper
 "It's the Hard Knock Life" – Annie, Mia, Isabella, Tessie and Pepper
 "Tomorrow" – Annie
 "I Think I'm Gonna Like It Here" – Annie, Grace and Mrs. Kovacevic
 "Little Girls" – Miss Hannigan
 "The City's Yours" – Stacks and Annie
 "Opportunity" – Annie
 "Easy Street" – Guy and Miss Hannigan
 "Who Am I?" – Miss Hannigan, Stacks, and Annie
 "I Don't Need Anything But You" – Stacks, Annie and Grace
 "Tomorrow (Finale)" – Cast (Annie, Stacks, Grace, Miss Hannigan, Lou, Nash, Mrs. Kovacevic, Pepper, Mia, Tessie, Isabella, etc.)
 "You're Never Fully Dressed Without a Smile" (end credits) - Sia

Production

Development
Sony Pictures first announced the film in January 2011, with Jay-Z and Will Smith serving as producers and Smith's daughter, Willow Smith, attached to play the lead role. In February 2011, Glee co-creator Ryan Murphy became front-runner to direct the film, but by March, he had declined due to filming new episodes.

The production soon began seeking a screenwriter and actress Emma Thompson was considered. No developments arrived until May 2012, when Will Smith appeared on Good Morning America and provided updates, including that the film would be set in modern-day New York City, that Thompson was providing a script and that Jay-Z would also provide new songs for the film. In July 2012, We Bought a Zoo screenwriter Aline Brosh McKenna wrote a second draft of the script. In August, it was announced production was to begin in Spring 2013.

In January 2013, Easy A director Will Gluck was hired to direct but Willow Smith had aged out.

Casting
By February 2013, Beasts of the Southern Wild star and Oscar nominee Quvenzhané Wallis had replaced Smith in the lead role, and the film was given a Christmas 2014 release date.

In March 2013, the search for the rest of the cast continued and Justin Timberlake was rumored for the role of Daddy Warbucks. This was proven false when Jamie Foxx signed on for the role, which was renamed William "Will" Stacks. In June 2013, Cameron Diaz was cast as Miss Hannigan after Sandra Bullock declined.

In July 2013, Rose Byrne joined the cast as Grace Farrell, Stacks's faithful assistant and in August, Boardwalk Empire star and partner of Rose Byrne, Bobby Cannavale joined the cast as a "bulldog political adviser" to Will Stacks. In September, the rest of the cast was announced: Amanda Troya, Nicolette Pierini, Eden Duncan-Smith, and Zoe Colletti as Annie's foster sisters.

As of September 19, 2013, principal photography had begun. Shooting was done at Grumman Studios. Other scenes were filmed at the new Four World Trade Center.

Writing
While "rooted in the same story" according to Gluck, this adaptation is a contemporary take on the 1977 Broadway musical and contains many differences from the original: The setting was changed from the 1930s — the era of Franklin D. Roosevelt's presidency and the Great Depression — to present-day New York City. The opening school scene features class presentations by both the new Annie and a student representing her classic appearance, discussing aspects of and parallels between the economic states of the two settings, such as the New Deal and the modern lower class.

While Hannigan is complicit in deceiving Stacks and Annie that Annie's birth parents have been found (conspiring with Stacks' campaign manager Guy Danlily), they are not impersonated by Hannigan's brother Rooster and his girlfriend Lily as in the original version. Instead, Guy has 'people he uses for this kind of work' take Annie. The fate of Annie's birth parents is left open, whereas in previous versions Hannigan reveals that they died sometime previously but Annie has not been told.

Release
The film officially premiered at the Ziegfeld Theater in New York City on December 7, 2014.

Piracy
On November 27, 2014, Annie was one of several films leaked by the "Guardians of Peace", a group that the FBI believes has ties to North Korea, following its breach of Columbia's parent company Sony Pictures Entertainment. Within three days of the initial leak, Annie had been downloaded by an estimated 206,000 unique IPs. By December 9, the count had risen to over 316,000. The chief analyst at BoxOffice.com felt that despite this, the leak was unlikely to affect Annies box office performance as the demographic who pirates movies isn't the target audience for the film.

Home media
Annie was released on DVD and Blu-ray/DVD combo pack on March 17, 2015, by Sony Pictures Home Entertainment.

Reception

Box office
Annie opened on December 19, 2014, and earned $5.3 million on its opening day. In the first weekend, the film made $15.9 million and ranked third in the North American box office behind other new releases The Hobbit: The Battle of the Five Armies and Night at the Museum: Secret of the Tomb. The film grossed $85.9 million in North America and $47.9 million overseas for a worldwide total of $133.8 million.

Critical response
On Rotten Tomatoes, the film has an approval rating of 28% based on 155 reviews and an average rating of 4.48/10. The site's critical consensus reads, "The new-look Annie hints at a progressive take on a well-worn story, but smothers its likable cast under clichés, cloying cuteness, and a distasteful materialism." On Metacritic, the film has a score of 33 out of 100 based on 38 critics, indicating "generally unfavorable reviews". Audiences polled by CinemaScore gave the film an average grade of "A−" on an A+ to F scale.

PopMatters magazine rated Annie with a three out of ten, saying, "In its aggravatingly choreographed frenzy, the party scene epitomizes Annie: it's trying too hard both to be and not be the previous Annies, it's trying too little to be innovative or vaguely inspired. It's as crass as Miss Hannigan and as greedy as Stacks, at least until they learn their lessons. The movie doesn't appear to learn a thing." Michael Phillips of the Chicago Tribune gave Annie one-and-a-half stars, describing the adaptation as being "wobbly" and "unsatisfying", criticizing the commercialized nature of the plot changes, concluding that it was "finesse-free and perilously low on the simple performance pleasures we look for in any musical, of any period." Ben Sachs of the Chicago Reader gave the film three out of four stars, praising the "surprising amount of bite: the filmmakers openly acknowledge the similarities between the Great Depression and the present, and the populist message, however overstated, always registers as sincere." Sachs also praised director Will Gluck for "striking a buoyant tone that feels closer to classic Hollywood musicals than contemporary kiddie fare."

The soundtrack, rearranged by Sia Furler and Greg Kurstin, received a polarizing response from critics, with much criticism going towards the heavy use of auto-tune. Entertainment Weekly described its soundtrack as an auto-tuned "disaster," noting that "you won't ever hear a worse rendition of 'Easy Street' than the one performed by Diaz and Cannivale — I promise." David Rooney of The Hollywood Reporter says "all but a handful of the existing songs have been shredded, often retaining just a signature line or two and drowning it in desperately hip polyrhythmic sounds, aurally assaultive arrangements and inane new lyrics." Matt Zoller Seitz however, praised the soundtrack's new songs.

The performances were more positively received by some critics. IGN.com praised Wallis and Foxx for being "on-point" throughout much of the film, as well as Rose Byrne, calling her the "surprise" of the film. Matt Zoller Seitz called Wallis "the first Annie to bring something both culturally and personally new to this role," and praised the rest of the cast too, including Foxx and Byrne. Cameron Diaz's performance received polarized reviews, with critics praising her effort, but ultimately calling it too "vampy," as well as "strident and obnoxious." Peter Travers of Rolling Stone says that she "overacts the role to the point of hysteria."

Accolades

References

External links

 
 
 
 

2014 films
2014 comedy films
2014 drama films
2014 comedy-drama films
2010s English-language films
2010s musical comedy-drama films
African-American comedy films
African-American drama films
African-American musical films
African-American films
American children's musical films
American musical comedy-drama films
Columbia Pictures films
Live-action films based on comics
Films about adoption
Films about elections
Films about orphans
Films based on adaptations
Films based on American comics
Films based on comic strips
Films based on Little Orphan Annie
Films based on musicals
Films directed by Will Gluck
Films produced by Jay-Z
Films produced by Jada Pinkett Smith
Films produced by Will Smith
Films set in New York City
Films shot in New York City
Films with screenplays by Aline Brosh McKenna
Golden Raspberry Award winning films
Overbrook Entertainment films
Village Roadshow Pictures films
2010s American films